The 115th United States Congress was a meeting of the legislative branch of the United States of America federal government, composed of the Senate and the House of Representatives. It met in Washington, D.C., from January 3, 2017, to January 3, 2019, during the final weeks of Barack Obama's presidency and the first two years of Donald Trump's presidency. The seats in the House were apportioned based on the 2010 United States census.

The Republican Party retained their majority in both the House and the Senate, and, with inauguration of Donald Trump on January 20, 2017, attained an overall federal government trifecta for the first time since the 109th Congress in 2005.

Several political scientists described the legislative accomplishments of this Congress as modest, considering that both Congress and the presidency were under unified Republican Party control. According to a contemporary study, "House and Senate GOP majorities struggled to legislate: GOP fissures and the president frequently undermined the Republican agenda. Most notably, clashes within and between the two parties (for example, on healthcare issues) strained old ways of doing business."

Major events 

 January 5, 2017: House of Representatives condemned United Nations Security Council Resolution 2334.
 January 6, 2017: Joint session counted and certified the electoral votes of the 2016 presidential election.
 January 11–12, 2017: Senate, in an all-night session, took first steps to repeal the Affordable Care Act, (ACA). The final vote was 51 to 48 to approve a budget resolution to allow "broad swaths of the Affordable Care Act to be repealed through a process known as budget reconciliation."
 January 20, 2017: Donald Trump became 45th President of the United States
 February 7, 2017: Vice President Mike Pence cast the tie-breaking vote to confirm Betsy DeVos as Secretary of Education. This was the first time in United States history that a cabinet confirmation was tied in the Senate and required a tie-breaking vote.
 February 28, 2017: President Trump addressed a joint session of Congress.
 April 6, 2017: Senate invoked the "nuclear option" to weaken Supreme Court filibusters. Nominee Neil Gorsuch was then confirmed the next day.
 June 14, 2017: Majority Whip Steve Scalise and several staffers were shot during the Congressional baseball shooting. They were practicing for the annual Congressional Baseball Game.
 September 1, 2017: The Parliamentarian of the United States Senate decreed that the Senate had until the end of the month to pass ACA repeal via the reconciliation process, or the option would no longer be viable.
 October 24 – December 14, 2017: 2017 United States political sexual scandals from the "Me too" movement:
 Allegations that Democratic Congressman Ruben Kihuen sexually harassed a campaign staffer led some in congressional leadership to call for his resignation. Kihuen later announced he would not seek another term in office.
 Democratic senator Al Franken announced he would resign "in the coming weeks" after photographs were made public suggesting that he sexually assaulted (groped) a Los Angeles-based radio personality during a USO tour in Iraq in 2006. He was also accused by multiple female constituents of groping at various Minnesota fair appearances that he attended.
 Three members of Congress either resigned or announced their impending resignations. (See "Changes in membership")
 Allegations that President Donald Trump previously raped and sexually harassed at least nineteen women, one girl, and Miss Teen USA contestants resulted in calls by members of Congress for him to resign.
 Allegations that Republican Alabama Senate candidate Roy Moore previously raped and sexually harassed at least eight women and one girl contributed to his defeat by Democrat Doug Jones in a special Senate election to replace Attorney General Jeff Sessions.
 Allegations that House member Blake Farenthold sexually harassed a former staffer resulted in the commencement of an investigation by the House Ethics Committee and his announcement he would not seek re-election in 2018. He subsequently resigned on April 6, 2018.
 January 20–22, 2018: United States federal government shutdown of January 2018
 January 30, 2018: 2018 State of the Union Address
 February 9, 2018: United States federal government funding gap

 October 6, 2018: Senate confirms Brett Kavanaugh's nomination to the U.S. Supreme Court.
 November 28, 2018: Senate discharges from committee and calendars , bill that ends US intervention in the Yemeni Civil War.
 December 22, 2018 – January 25, 2019: 2018–19 United States federal government shutdown

Major legislation

Enacted 

 January 31, 2017: GAO Access and Oversight Act of 2017, Pub.L. 115-3
 February 28, 2017: Promoting Women in Entrepreneurship Act, Pub.L. 115-6
 February 28, 2017: INSPIRE Women Act, Pub.L. 115-7
 March 28, 2017: Vietnam War Veterans Recognition Act of 2017, Pub.L. 115-15
 April 18, 2017: Weather Research and Forecasting Innovation Act of 2017, Pub.L. 115-25
 May 5, 2017: Consolidated Appropriations Act, 2017, 
 August 2, 2017: Countering America's Adversaries Through Sanctions Act, 
 November 2, 2017: Strengthening State and Local Cyber Crime Fighting Act of 2017, Pub.L. 115-76
 December 12, 2017: National Defense Authorization Act for Fiscal Year 2018, 
 December 22, 2017: Tax Cuts and Jobs Act of 2017, 
 February 9, 2018: Bipartisan Budget Act of 2018, 
 February 14, 2018: Protecting Young Victims from Sexual Abuse and Safe Sport Authorization Act of 2017, Pub.L. 115-126
 March 16, 2018: Taiwan Travel Act, 
 March 23, 2018: Consolidated Appropriations Act, 2018 (including the CLOUD Act), 
 April 11, 2018: Stop Enabling Sex Traffickers Act, 
 May 9, 2018: Justice for Uncompensated Survivors Today (JUST) Act, Pub.L. 115-171
 May 24, 2018: Economic Growth, Regulatory Relief and Consumer Protection Act, 
 May 30, 2018: Trickett Wendler, Frank Mongiello, Jordan McLinn, and Matthew Bellina Right to Try Act of 2017, 
 August 13, 2018: National Defense Authorization Act for Fiscal Year 2019, 
 October 5, 2018: FAA Reauthorization Act of 2018, 
 October 9, 2018: Marrakesh Treaty Implementation Act, Pub.L. 115-261
 October 11, 2018: Music Modernization Act, 
 October 23, 2018: America's Water Infrastructure Act of 2018, 
 October 24, 2018: SUPPORT for Patients and Communities Act, 
 November 16, 2018: Cybersecurity and Infrastructure Security Agency Act, 
 December 7, 2018: Amy, Vicky, and Andy Child Pornography Victim Assistance Act of 2018, Pub.L. 115-299
 December 11, 2018: Iraq and Syria Genocide Relief and Accountability Act of 2018, Pub.L. 115-300
 December 20, 2018: Agriculture Improvement Act of 2018, 
 December 21, 2018: National Quantum Initiative Act, Pub.L. 115-368
 December 21, 2018: FIRST STEP Act, 
 January 14, 2019: Foundations for Evidence-Based Policymaking Act of 2018, Pub.L. 115-435
 January 14, 2019: Elie Wiesel Genocide and Atrocities Prevention Act of 2018, Pub.L. 115-441

Proposed 

 May 4, 2017: American Health Care Act, passed House May 4, 2017
 June 8, 2017: Financial CHOICE Act, passed House June 8, 2017

Party summary 
Resignations and new members are discussed in the "Changes in membership" section, below.

Senate

House of Representatives

Leadership

Senate 

 President: Joe Biden (D), until January 20, 2017
 Mike Pence (R), from January 20, 2017
 President pro tempore: Orrin Hatch (R)

Majority (Republican) leadership 
 Majority Leader: Mitch McConnell
 Majority Whip: John Cornyn
 Republican Conference Chairman: John Thune
 Republican Conference Vice Chairman: Roy Blunt
 Republican Campaign Committee Chairman: Cory Gardner
 Policy Committee Chairman: John Barrasso

Minority (Democratic) leadership 
 Minority Leader: Chuck Schumer
 Minority Whip: Dick Durbin
 Assistant Minority Leader: Patty Murray
 Chief Deputy Whip: Jeff Merkley
 Democratic Caucus Chairman: Chuck Schumer
 Policy Committee Chairwoman: Debbie Stabenow
 Democratic Caucus Vice Chairs: Mark Warner and Elizabeth Warren
 Democratic Caucus Secretary: Tammy Baldwin
 Democratic Campaign Committee Chairman: Chris Van Hollen
 Policy Committee Vice Chairman: Joe Manchin
 Steering Committee Chairwoman: Amy Klobuchar
 Outreach Chair: Bernie Sanders

House of Representatives 

 Speaker: Paul Ryan (R)

Majority (Republican) leadership 
 Majority Leader: Kevin McCarthy
 Majority Whip: Steve Scalise
 Republican Conference Chairman: Cathy McMorris Rodgers
 Republican Conference Vice-Chairman: Doug Collins
 Republican Conference Secretary: Jason T. Smith
 Republican Campaign Committee Chairman: Steve Stivers
 Policy Committee Chairman: Luke Messer

Minority (Democratic) leadership 
 Minority Leader: Nancy Pelosi
 Minority Whip: Steny Hoyer
 Assistant Minority Leader: Jim Clyburn
 Democratic Caucus Chairman: Joseph Crowley
 Democratic Caucus Vice-Chairwoman: Linda Sánchez
 Democratic Campaign Committee Chairman: Ben Ray Luján
 Steering and Policy Committee Co-Chairs: Rosa DeLauro and Eric Swalwell
 Policy and Communications Chairmen: Cheri Bustos, David Cicilline, and Hakeem Jeffries

Demographics 
Note: Demographics are accurate as of the commencement of the 115th Congress on January 3, 2017.

The average age of members of the House of Representatives during the 115th Congress was 57.8 years, while the average age of U.S. senators was 61.8 years.

The most common occupation of senators prior to being elected to their posts was law, followed by public service/politics and business. In the House of Representatives, business was the dominant prior occupation, followed by public service/politics and law. In the 115th Congress, 94.1% of House members and 100% of senators had attained a bachelor's degree or a higher degree; this was a historically high level of education for a United States Congress. In addition, 167 members of the House and 55 members of the Senate had law degrees. Only 18 members of Congress had no college education.

Ethnic minorities in the 115th Congress consisted of 52 African American members, 45 Hispanic or Latino members, 18 Asian-American or Pacific Islander members, and two members of Native American ancestry. Women comprised 20.1% of the membership in the 115th Congress, which had 109 women and 326 men. This represented an increase of 21 women from the 114th Congress.

Seven openly LGBT members served in the 115th Congress. Tammy Baldwin, Jared Polis, Sean Patrick Maloney, Mark Takano, David Cicilline, and Mark Pocan are openly gay, while Kyrsten Sinema is openly bisexual.

The majority of the 115th Congress was religiously affiliated, with 90.7% identifying as Christians. Approximately half of the Christians were Protestant. Other religious faiths of congressmembers in the 115th Congress included Buddhism, Hinduism, Islam, and Judaism.

Members

Senate 

The numbers refer to their Senate classes. All of the class 3 seats were contested in the November 2016 elections. Class 1 terms end with this Congress, requiring re-election in 2018; Class 2 began in the last Congress, requiring re-election in 2020; and Class 3 began in this Congress, requiring re-election in 2022.

Alabama 
 2. Jeff Sessions (R) (until February 8, 2017)
 Luther Strange (R), (from February 9, 2017 to January 3, 2018)
 Doug Jones (D), (from January 3, 2018)
 3. Richard Shelby (R)

Alaska 
 2. Dan Sullivan (R)
 3. Lisa Murkowski (R)

Arizona 
 1. Jeff Flake (R)
 3. John McCain (R), (until August 25, 2018)
 Jon Kyl (R), (from September 4, 2018 to December 31, 2018)
 Vacant

Arkansas 
 2. Tom Cotton (R)
 3. John Boozman (R)

California 
 1. Dianne Feinstein (D)
 3. Kamala Harris (D)

Colorado 
 2. Cory Gardner (R)
 3. Michael Bennet (D)

Connecticut 
 1. Chris Murphy (D)
 3. Richard Blumenthal (D)

Delaware 
 1. Tom Carper (D)
 2. Chris Coons (D)

Florida 
 1. Bill Nelson (D)
 3. Marco Rubio (R)

Georgia 
 2. David Perdue (R)
 3. Johnny Isakson (R)

Hawaii 
 1. Mazie Hirono (D)
 3. Brian Schatz (D)

Idaho 
 2. Jim Risch (R)
 3. Mike Crapo (R)

Illinois 
 2. Dick Durbin (D)
 3. Tammy Duckworth (D)

Indiana 
 1. Joe Donnelly (D)
 3. Todd Young (R)

Iowa 
 2. Joni Ernst (R)
 3. Chuck Grassley (R)

Kansas 
 2. Pat Roberts (R)
 3. Jerry Moran (R)

Kentucky 
 2. Mitch McConnell (R)
 3. Rand Paul (R)

Louisiana 
 2. Bill Cassidy (R)
 3. John Kennedy (R)

Maine 
 1. Angus King (I)
 2. Susan Collins (R)

Maryland 
 1. Ben Cardin (D)
 3. Chris Van Hollen (D)

Massachusetts 
 1. Elizabeth Warren (D)
 2. Ed Markey (D)

Michigan 
 1. Debbie Stabenow (D)
 2. Gary Peters (D)

Minnesota 
 1. Amy Klobuchar (DFL)
  2. Al Franken (DFL),(until January 2, 2018)
  Tina Smith (DFL),(from January 3, 2018)

Mississippi 
 1. Roger Wicker (R)
 2. Thad Cochran (R), (until April 1, 2018)
 Cindy Hyde-Smith (R), (from April 2, 2018)

Missouri 
 1. Claire McCaskill (D)
 3. Roy Blunt (R)

Montana 
 1. Jon Tester (D)
 2. Steve Daines (R)

Nebraska 
 1. Deb Fischer (R)
 2. Ben Sasse (R)

Nevada 
 1. Dean Heller (R)
 3. Catherine Cortez Masto (D)

New Hampshire 
 2. Jeanne Shaheen (D)
 3. Maggie Hassan (D)

New Jersey 
 1. Bob Menendez (D)
 2. Cory Booker (D)

New Mexico 
 1. Martin Heinrich (D)
 2. Tom Udall (D)

New York 
 1. Kirsten Gillibrand (D)
 3. Chuck Schumer (D)

North Carolina 
 2. Thom Tillis (R)
 3. Richard Burr (R)

North Dakota 
 1. Heidi Heitkamp (D-NPL)
 3. John Hoeven (R)

Ohio 
 1. Sherrod Brown (D)
 3. Rob Portman (R)

Oklahoma 
 2. Jim Inhofe (R)
 3. James Lankford (R)

Oregon 
 2. Jeff Merkley (D)
 3. Ron Wyden (D)

Pennsylvania 
 1. Bob Casey Jr. (D)
 3. Pat Toomey (R)

Rhode Island 
 1. Sheldon Whitehouse (D)
 2. Jack Reed (D)

South Carolina 
 2. Lindsey Graham (R)
 3. Tim Scott (R)

South Dakota 
 2. Mike Rounds (R)
 3. John Thune (R)

Tennessee 
 1. Bob Corker (R)
 2. Lamar Alexander (R)

Texas 
 1. Ted Cruz (R)
 2. John Cornyn (R)

Utah 
 1. Orrin Hatch (R)
 3. Mike Lee (R)

Vermont 
 1. Bernie Sanders (I)
 3. Patrick Leahy (D)

Virginia 
 1. Tim Kaine (D)
 2. Mark Warner (D)

Washington 
 1. Maria Cantwell (D)
 3. Patty Murray (D)

West Virginia 
 1. Joe Manchin (D)
 2. Shelley Moore Capito (R)

Wisconsin 
 1. Tammy Baldwin (D)
 3. Ron Johnson (R)

Wyoming 
 1. John Barrasso (R)
 2. Mike Enzi (R)

House of Representatives 

All 435 seats were filled by the regular elections on November 8, 2016, or subsequent special elections thereafter.

Alabama 
 . Bradley Byrne (R)
 . Martha Roby (R)
 . Mike Rogers (R)
 . Robert Aderholt (R)
 . Mo Brooks (R)
 . Gary Palmer (R)
 . Terri Sewell (D)

Alaska 
 . Don Young (R)

Arizona 
 . Tom O'Halleran (D)
 . Martha McSally (R)
 . Raúl Grijalva (D)
 . Paul Gosar (R)
 . Andy Biggs (R)
 . David Schweikert (R)
 . Ruben Gallego (D)
 . Trent Franks (R), until December 8, 2017
 Debbie Lesko (R), from April 24, 2018
 . Kyrsten Sinema (D)

Arkansas 
 . Rick Crawford (R)
 . French Hill (R)
 . Steve Womack (R)
 . Bruce Westerman (R)

California 
 . Doug LaMalfa (R)
 . Jared Huffman (D)
 . John Garamendi (D)
 . Tom McClintock (R)
 . Mike Thompson (D)
 . Doris Matsui (D)
 . Ami Bera (D)
 . Paul Cook (R)
 . Jerry McNerney (D)
 . Jeff Denham (R)
 . Mark DeSaulnier (D)
 . Nancy Pelosi (D)
 . Barbara Lee (D)
 . Jackie Speier (D)
 . Eric Swalwell (D)
 . Jim Costa (D)
 . Ro Khanna (D)
 . Anna Eshoo (D)
 . Zoe Lofgren (D)
 . Jimmy Panetta (D)
 . David Valadao (R)
 . Devin Nunes (R)
 . Kevin McCarthy (R)
 . Salud Carbajal (D)
 . Steve Knight (R)
 . Julia Brownley (D)
 . Judy Chu (D)
 . Adam Schiff (D)
 . Tony Cárdenas (D)
 . Brad Sherman (D)
 . Pete Aguilar (D)
 . Grace Napolitano (D)
 . Ted Lieu (D)
 . Xavier Becerra (D), until January 24, 2017
 Jimmy Gomez (D), from June 6, 2017
 . Norma Torres (D)
 . Raul Ruiz (D)
 . Karen Bass (D)
 . Linda Sánchez (D)
 . Ed Royce (R)
 . Lucille Roybal-Allard (D)
 . Mark Takano (D)
 . Ken Calvert (R)
 . Maxine Waters (D)
 . Nanette Barragán (D)
 . Mimi Walters (R)
 . Lou Correa (D)
 . Alan Lowenthal (D)
 . Dana Rohrabacher (R)
 . Darrell Issa (R)
 . Duncan D. Hunter (R)
 . Juan Vargas (D)
 . Scott Peters (D)
 . Susan Davis (D)

Colorado 
 . Diana DeGette (D)
 . Jared Polis (D)
 . Scott Tipton (R)
 . Ken Buck (R)
 . Doug Lamborn (R)
 . Mike Coffman (R)
 . Ed Perlmutter (D)

Connecticut 
 . John B. Larson (D)
 . Joe Courtney (D)
 . Rosa DeLauro (D)
 . Jim Himes (D)
 . Elizabeth Esty (D)

Delaware 
 . Lisa Blunt Rochester (D)

Florida 
 . Matt Gaetz (R)
 . Neal Dunn (R)
 . Ted Yoho (R)
 . John Rutherford (R)
 . Al Lawson (D)
 . Ron DeSantis (R), until September 10, 2018
 Vacant
 . Stephanie Murphy (D)
 . Bill Posey (R)
 . Darren Soto (D)
 . Val Demings (D)
 . Daniel Webster (R)
 . Gus Bilirakis (R)
 . Charlie Crist (D)
 . Kathy Castor (D)
 . Dennis A. Ross (R)
 . Vern Buchanan (R)
 . Tom Rooney (R)
 . Brian Mast (R)
 . Francis Rooney (R)
 . Alcee Hastings (D)
 . Lois Frankel (D)
 . Ted Deutch (D)
 . Debbie Wasserman Schultz (D)
 . Frederica Wilson (D)
 . Mario Díaz-Balart (R)
 . Carlos Curbelo (R)
 . Ileana Ros-Lehtinen (R)

Georgia 
 . Buddy Carter (R)
 . Sanford Bishop (D)
 . Drew Ferguson (R)
 . Hank Johnson (D)
 . John Lewis (D)
 . Tom Price (R), until February 10, 2017
 Karen Handel (R), from June 20, 2017
 . Rob Woodall (R)
 . Austin Scott (R)
 . Doug Collins (R)
 . Jody Hice (R)
 . Barry Loudermilk (R)
 . Rick W. Allen (R)
 . David Scott (D)
 . Tom Graves (R)

Hawaii 
 . Colleen Hanabusa (D)
 . Tulsi Gabbard (D)

Idaho 
 . Raúl Labrador (R)
 . Mike Simpson (R)

Illinois 
 . Bobby Rush (D)
 . Robin Kelly (D)
 . Dan Lipinski (D)
 . Luis Gutiérrez (D)
 . Mike Quigley (D)
 . Peter Roskam (R)
 . Danny K. Davis (D)
 . Raja Krishnamoorthi (D)
 . Jan Schakowsky (D)
 . Brad Schneider (D)
 . Bill Foster (D)
 . Mike Bost (R)
 . Rodney Davis (R)
 . Randy Hultgren (R)
 . John Shimkus (R)
 . Adam Kinzinger (R)
 . Cheri Bustos (D)
 . Darin LaHood (R)

Indiana 
 . Pete Visclosky (D)
 . Jackie Walorski (R)
 . Jim Banks (R)
 . Todd Rokita (R)
 . Susan Brooks (R)
 . Luke Messer (R)
 . André Carson (D)
 . Larry Bucshon (R)
 . Trey Hollingsworth (R)

Iowa 
 . Rod Blum (R)
 . Dave Loebsack (D)
 . David Young (R)
 . Steve King (R)

Kansas 
 . Roger Marshall (R)
 . Lynn Jenkins (R)
 . Kevin Yoder (R)
 . Mike Pompeo (R), until January 23, 2017
 Ron Estes (R), from April 11, 2017

Kentucky 
 . James Comer (R)
 . Brett Guthrie (R)
 . John Yarmuth (D)
 . Thomas Massie (R)
 . Hal Rogers (R)
 . Andy Barr (R)

Louisiana 
 . Steve Scalise (R)
 . Cedric Richmond (D)
 . Clay Higgins (R)
 . Mike Johnson (R)
 . Ralph Abraham (R)
 . Garret Graves (R)

Maine 
 . Chellie Pingree (D)
 . Bruce Poliquin (R)

Maryland 
 . Andy Harris (R)
 . Dutch Ruppersberger (D)
 . John Sarbanes (D)
 . Anthony Brown (D)
 . Steny Hoyer (D)
 . John Delaney (D)
 . Elijah Cummings (D)
 . Jamie Raskin (D)

Massachusetts 
 . Richard Neal (D)
 . Jim McGovern (D)
 . Niki Tsongas (D)
 . Joseph P. Kennedy III (D)
 . Katherine Clark (D)
 . Seth Moulton (D)
 . Mike Capuano (D)
 . Stephen F. Lynch (D)
 . Bill Keating (D)

Michigan 
 . Jack Bergman (R)
 . Bill Huizenga (R)
 . Justin Amash (R)
 . John Moolenaar (R)
 . Dan Kildee (D)
 . Fred Upton (R)
 . Tim Walberg (R)
 . Mike Bishop (R)
 . Sander Levin (D)
 . Paul Mitchell (R)
 . Dave Trott (R)
 . Debbie Dingell (D)
 . John Conyers (D), until December 5, 2017
 Brenda Jones (D), from November 29, 2018
 . Brenda Lawrence (D)

Minnesota 
 . Tim Walz (DFL)
 . Jason Lewis (R)
 . Erik Paulsen (R)
 . Betty McCollum (DFL)
 . Keith Ellison (DFL)
 . Tom Emmer (R)
 . Collin Peterson (DFL)
 . Rick Nolan (DFL)

Mississippi 
 . Trent Kelly (R)
 . Bennie Thompson (D)
 . Gregg Harper (R)
 . Steven Palazzo (R)

Missouri 
 . Lacy Clay (D)
 . Ann Wagner (R)
 . Blaine Luetkemeyer (R)
 . Vicky Hartzler (R)
 . Emanuel Cleaver (D)
 . Sam Graves (R)
 . Billy Long (R)
 . Jason T. Smith (R)

Montana 
 . Ryan Zinke (R), until March 1, 2017
 Greg Gianforte (R), from May 25, 2017

Nebraska 
 . Jeff Fortenberry (R)
 . Don Bacon (R)
 . Adrian Smith (R)

Nevada 
 . Dina Titus (D)
 . Mark Amodei (R)
 . Jacky Rosen (D)
 . Ruben Kihuen (D)

New Hampshire 
 . Carol Shea-Porter (D)
 . Annie Kuster (D)

New Jersey 
 . Donald Norcross (D)
 . Frank LoBiondo (R)
 . Tom MacArthur (R)
 . Chris Smith (R)
 . Josh Gottheimer (D)
 . Frank Pallone (D)
 . Leonard Lance (R)
 . Albio Sires (D)
 . Bill Pascrell (D)
 . Donald Payne Jr. (D)
 . Rodney Frelinghuysen (R)
 . Bonnie Watson Coleman (D)

New Mexico 
 . Michelle Lujan Grisham (D), until December 31, 2018
 Vacant
 . Steve Pearce (R)
 . Ben Ray Luján (D)

New York 
 . Lee Zeldin (R)
 . Peter T. King (R)
 . Thomas Suozzi (D)
 . Kathleen Rice (D)
 . Gregory Meeks (D)
 . Grace Meng (D)
 . Nydia Velázquez (D)
 . Hakeem Jeffries (D)
 . Yvette Clarke (D)
 . Jerrold Nadler (D)
 . Dan Donovan (R)
 . Carolyn Maloney (D)
 . Adriano Espaillat (D)
 . Joseph Crowley (D)
 . José E. Serrano (D)
 . Eliot Engel (D)
 . Nita Lowey (D)
 . Sean Patrick Maloney (D)
 . John Faso (R)
 . Paul Tonko (D)
 . Elise Stefanik (R)
 . Claudia Tenney (R)
 . Tom Reed (R)
 . John Katko (R)
 . Louise Slaughter (D), until March 16, 2018
 Joseph D. Morelle (D), from November 6, 2018
 . Brian Higgins (D)
 . Chris Collins (R)

North Carolina 
 . G. K. Butterfield (D)
 . George Holding (R)
 . Walter B. Jones Jr. (R)
 . David Price (D)
 . Virginia Foxx (R)
 . Mark Walker (R)
 . David Rouzer (R)
 . Richard Hudson (R)
 . Robert Pittenger (R)
 . Patrick McHenry (R)
 . Mark Meadows (R)
 . Alma Adams (D)
 . Ted Budd (R)

North Dakota 
 . Kevin Cramer (R)

Ohio 
 . Steve Chabot (R)
 . Brad Wenstrup (R)
 . Joyce Beatty (D)
 . Jim Jordan (R)
 . Bob Latta (R)
 . Bill Johnson (R)
 . Bob Gibbs (R)
 . Warren Davidson (R)
 . Marcy Kaptur (D)
 . Mike Turner (R)
 . Marcia Fudge (D)
 . Pat Tiberi (R), until January 15, 2018
 Troy Balderson (R), from August 7, 2018
 . Tim Ryan (D)
 . David Joyce (R)
 . Steve Stivers (R)
 . Jim Renacci (R)

Oklahoma 
 . Jim Bridenstine (R), until April 23, 2018
 Kevin Hern (R), from November 6, 2018
 . Markwayne Mullin (R)
 . Frank Lucas (R)
 . Tom Cole (R)
 . Steve Russell (R)

Oregon 
 . Suzanne Bonamici (D)
 . Greg Walden (R)
 . Earl Blumenauer (D)
 . Peter DeFazio (D)
 . Kurt Schrader (D)

Pennsylvania 
 . Bob Brady (D)
 . Dwight Evans (D)
 . Mike Kelly (R)
 . Scott Perry (R)
 . Glenn Thompson (R)
 . Ryan Costello (R)
 . Pat Meehan (R), until April 27, 2018
 Mary Gay Scanlon (D), from November 6, 2018
 . Brian Fitzpatrick (R)
 . Bill Shuster (R)
 . Tom Marino (R)
 . Lou Barletta (R)
 . Keith Rothfus (R)
 . Brendan Boyle (D)
 . Michael F. Doyle (D)
 . Charlie Dent (R), until May 12, 2018
 Susan Wild (D), from November 6, 2018
 . Lloyd Smucker (R)
 . Matt Cartwright (D)
 . Tim Murphy (R), until October 21, 2017
 Conor Lamb (D) from March 13, 2018

Rhode Island 
 . David Cicilline (D)
 . James Langevin (D)

South Carolina 
 . Mark Sanford (R)
 . Joe Wilson (R)
 . Jeff Duncan (R)
 . Trey Gowdy (R)
 . Mick Mulvaney (R), until February 16, 2017
 Ralph Norman (R), from June 20, 2017
 . Jim Clyburn (D)
 . Tom Rice (R)

South Dakota 
 . Kristi Noem (R)

Tennessee 
 . Phil Roe (R)
 . Jimmy Duncan (R)
 . Chuck Fleischmann (R)
 . Scott DesJarlais (R)
 . Jim Cooper (D)
 . Diane Black (R)
 . Marsha Blackburn (R)
 . David Kustoff (R)
 . Steve Cohen (D)

Texas 
 . Louie Gohmert (R)
 . Ted Poe (R)
 . Sam Johnson (R)
 . John Ratcliffe (R)
 . Jeb Hensarling (R)
 . Joe Barton (R)
 . John Culberson (R)
 . Kevin Brady (R)
 . Al Green (D)
 . Michael McCaul (R)
 . Mike Conaway (R)
 . Kay Granger (R)
 . Mac Thornberry (R)
 . Randy Weber (R)
 . Vicente Gonzalez (D)
 . Beto O'Rourke (D)
 . Bill Flores (R)
 . Sheila Jackson Lee (D)
 . Jodey Arrington (R)
 . Joaquín Castro (D)
 . Lamar S. Smith (R)
 . Pete Olson (R)
 . Will Hurd (R)
 . Kenny Marchant (R)
 . Roger Williams (R)
 . Michael Burgess (R)
 . Blake Farenthold (R), until April 6, 2018
 Michael Cloud (R), from June 30, 2018
 . Henry Cuellar (D)
 . Gene Green (D)
 . Eddie Bernice Johnson (D)
 . John Carter (R)
 . Pete Sessions (R)
 . Marc Veasey (D)
 . Filemon Vela Jr. (D)
 . Lloyd Doggett (D)
 . Brian Babin (R)

Utah 
 . Rob Bishop (R)
 . Chris Stewart (R)
 . Jason Chaffetz (R), until June 30, 2017
 John Curtis (R), from November 7, 2017
 . Mia Love (R)

Vermont 
 . Peter Welch (D)

Virginia 
 . Rob Wittman (R)
 . Scott Taylor (R)
 . Bobby Scott (D)
 . Donald McEachin (D)
 . Tom Garrett Jr. (R)
 . Bob Goodlatte (R)
 . Dave Brat (R)
 . Don Beyer (D)
 . Morgan Griffith (R)
 . Barbara Comstock (R)
 . Gerry Connolly (D)

Washington 
 . Suzan DelBene (D)
 . Rick Larsen (D)
 . Jaime Herrera Beutler (R)
 . Dan Newhouse (R)
 . Cathy McMorris Rodgers (R)
 . Derek Kilmer (D)
 . Pramila Jayapal (D)
 . Dave Reichert (R)
 . Adam Smith (D)
 . Dennis Heck (D)

West Virginia 
 . David McKinley (R)
 . Alex Mooney (R)
 . Evan Jenkins (R), until September 30, 2018
 Vacant

Wisconsin 
 . Paul Ryan (R)
 . Mark Pocan (D)
 . Ron Kind (D)
 . Gwen Moore (D)
 . Jim Sensenbrenner (R)
 . Glenn Grothman (R)
 . Sean Duffy (R)
 . Mike Gallagher (R)

Wyoming 
 . Liz Cheney (R)

Non-voting members 
 . Amata Coleman Radewagen (R)
 . Eleanor Holmes Norton (D)
 . Madeleine Bordallo (D)
 . Gregorio Sablan (I)
 . Jenniffer González (PNP/R) (Resident Commissioner)
 . Stacey Plaskett (D)

Caucuses

Changes in membership

Senate 

|-
| Alabama(2)
| nowrap  | Jeff Sessions(R)
| Resigned February 8, 2017, to become U.S. Attorney General.Successor appointed February 9, 2017, to continue the term.
| nowrap  | Luther Strange(R)
| February 9, 2017

|-
| Minnesota(2)
| nowrap  | Al Franken(D)
| Resigned January 2, 2018, amid a sexual misconduct scandal.Successor appointed January 2, 2018, to continue the term.Appointee was later elected to finish the term.
| nowrap  | Tina Smith(D)
| January 3, 2018

|-
| Alabama(2)
| nowrap  | Luther Strange(R)
| Appointment expired January 3, 2018, following a special election.Successor elected December 12, 2017, to finish the term and qualified January 3, 2018.
| nowrap  | Doug Jones(D)
| January 3, 2018

|-
| Mississippi(2)
| nowrap  | Thad Cochran(R)
| Resigned April 1, 2018, for health reasons.Successor appointed April 2, 2018, to continue the term.Appointee was later elected to finish the term.
| nowrap  | Cindy Hyde-Smith(R)
| April 9, 2018

|-
| Arizona(3)
| nowrap  | John McCain(R)
| Died August 25, 2018.Successor appointed September 4, 2018, to continue the term.
| nowrap  | Jon Kyl(R)
| September 5, 2018

|-
| Arizona(3)
| nowrap  | Jon Kyl(R)
| Resigned December 31, 2018.Successor was seated in next Congress.
| colspan=2 | Vacant until the next Congress

|}

House of Representatives 

|-
| 
| nowrap  |(R)
| data-sort-value="January 23, 2017" |Resigned January 23, 2017, to become Director of the Central Intelligence Agency.A special election was held April 11, 2017.
| nowrap  |(R)
| April 25, 2017

|-
| 
| nowrap  |(D)
| data-sort-value="January 24, 2017" |Resigned January 24, 2017, to become Attorney General of California.A special election was held June 6, 2017.
| nowrap  |(D)
| July 11, 2017

|-
| 
| nowrap  |(R)
| data-sort-value="February 10, 2017" |Resigned February 10, 2017, to become U.S. Secretary of Health and Human Services.A special election was held June 20, 2017.
| nowrap |(R)
| June 26, 2017

|-
| 
| nowrap  |(R)
| data-sort-value="February 16, 2017" |Resigned February 16, 2017, to become Director of the Office of Management and Budget.A special election was held June 20, 2017.
| nowrap  |(R)
| June 26, 2017

|-
| 
| nowrap  |(R)
| data-sort-value="March 1, 2017" |Resigned March 1, 2017, to become U.S. Secretary of the Interior.A special election was held May 25, 2017.
| nowrap  |(R)
| June 21, 2017

|-
| 
| nowrap  |(R)
| data-sort-value="June 30, 2017" |Resigned June 30, 2017, for personal reasons.A special election was held November 7, 2017.
| nowrap  |(R)
| November 13, 2017

|-
| 
| nowrap  |(R)
| data-sort-value="October 21, 2017" |Resigned October 21, 2017.A special election was held March 13, 2018.
| nowrap  |(D)
| April 12, 2018

|-
| 
| nowrap  |(D)
| data-sort-value="December 5, 2017" |Resigned December 5, 2017. A special election was held November 6, 2018.
| nowrap  |(D)
| November 29, 2018

|-
| 
| nowrap  |(R)
| data-sort-value="December 8, 2017" |Resigned December 8, 2017. A special election was held April 24, 2018.
| nowrap  |(R)
| May 7, 2018

|-
| 
| nowrap  |(R)
| data-sort-value="January 15, 2018" |Resigned January 15, 2018, to lead the Ohio Business Roundtable.A special election was held August 7, 2018
|  |Troy Balderson (R)
| September 5, 2018

|-
| 
| nowrap  |(D)
| data-sort-value="March 16, 2018" |Died March 16, 2018.  A special election was held November 6, 2018.
| nowrap  |(D)
| November 13, 2018

|-
| 
| nowrap  |(R)
| data-sort-value="April 6, 2018" |Resigned April 6, 2018.A special election was held June 30, 2018.
| nowrap  |(R)
| July 10, 2018

|-
| 
| nowrap  |(R)
| data-sort-value="April 23, 2018" |Resigned April 23, 2018, to become the Administrator of National Aeronautics and Space Administration.Successor was elected to the next term and, by Oklahoma law, was considered thereby "appointed" November 6, 2018 to finish the current term. There is debate about the legality of such an appointment, however.
| nowrap  |(R)
| November 13, 2018

|-
| 
| nowrap  |(R)
| data-sort-value="April 27, 2018" |Resigned April 27, 2018.A special election was held November 6, 2018.
| nowrap  |(D)
| November 13, 2018

|-
| 
| nowrap  |(R)
| data-sort-value="May 12, 2018" |Resigned May 12, 2018.A special election was held November 6, 2018.
| nowrap  |(D)
| November 27, 2018

|-
| 
| nowrap  |(R)
| data-sort value="September 10, 2018" |Resigned September 10, 2018, to focus on gubernatorial campaign.Seat remained vacant until determined by general election.
| colspan=2 rowspan=3 |Vacant until the next Congress

|-
| 
| nowrap  |(R)
| data-sort value="September 30, 2018" |Resigned September 30, 2018, to become justice of the Supreme Court of Appeals of West Virginia.Seat remained vacant until determined by general election.

|-
| 
|  nowrap  |(D)
| data-sort value="December 31, 2018" |Resigned December 31, 2018, to become Governor of New Mexico.

|}

Committees 
Section contents: Senate, House, Joint

Senate

House of Representatives

Joint

Employees and legislative agency directors

Senate
 Chaplain: Barry C. Black (Seventh-day Adventist)
 Curator: Melinda Smith 
 Historian: Betty Koed 
 Librarian: Leona I. Faust
 Parliamentarian: Elizabeth MacDonough
 Secretary: Julie E. Adams
 Sergeant at Arms: Frank J. Larkin, until April 16, 2018 
 Michael C. Stenger, starting April 16, 2018
 Secretary for the Majority: Laura Dove
 Secretary for the Minority: Gary B. Myrick

House of Representatives 
 Chaplain: Patrick J. Conroy (Roman Catholic)
 Chief Administrative Officer: Phil Kiko
 Clerk: Karen L. Haas
 Historian: Matthew Wasniewski
 Inspector General: Theresa M. Grafenstine then Michael Ptasienski
 Parliamentarian: Thomas J. Wickham Jr.
 Reading Clerks: Susan Cole and Joseph Novotny
 Sergeant at Arms: Paul D. Irving

Legislative branch agency directors
 Architect of the Capitol: Stephen T. Ayers, until November 25, 2018
 Christine A. Merdon (acting), starting November 25, 2018
 Attending Physician of the United States Congress: Brian P. Monahan
 Comptroller General of the United States: Eugene Louis Dodaro
 Director of the Congressional Budget Office: Keith Hall
 Librarian of Congress: Carla Diane Hayden
 Public Printer of the United States: Jim Bradley

See also

Elections 
 2016 United States elections (elections leading to this Congress)
 2016 United States presidential election
 2016 United States Senate elections
 2016 United States House of Representatives elections
 2018 United States elections (elections during this Congress, leading to the next Congress)
 2018 United States Senate elections
 2018 United States House of Representatives elections

Membership lists 
 List of new members of the 115th United States Congress

Notes

References

External links 

 , via Congress.gov